Deloraine High School is a government co-educational comprehensive secondary school located in , Tasmania, Australia. Established in 1952, the school caters for approximately 300 students from Years 7 to 12. The school is administered by the Tasmanian Department of Education.

In 2020, student enrolments were 270. The school principal is David Lietzau.

Description 
In 1991, Deloraine High School had a major redevelopment costing approximately AUD$1 million and it upgraded the main core classrooms, the music classroom, and the two science labs.

In 2019, the Office of Tasmanian Assessment, Standards, and Certification reported that 55% of students achieved the Tasmanian Certificate of Education, 33% achieved an Australian Tertiary Admission Rank, and 12% attained a VET Certificate.

In 2020, the Australian Curriculum, Assessment and Reporting Authority reported that Deloraine High School reported that of the 270 students enrolled, 57% were identified as boys, 14% identified themselves as Indigenous, and 3% had a language background other than English.

See also 
 List of schools in Tasmania
 Education in Tasmania

References

External links

Public high schools in Tasmania
Educational institutions established in 1952
1952 establishments in Australia